Sebastian Fischer (born 7 May 1987) is a German footballer who plays as a midfielder for TSV Phönix Lomersheim.

References

External links
 
 Sebastian Fischer on FuPa.net

1987 births
Living people
German footballers
Germany youth international footballers
Association football midfielders
Karlsruher SC II players
SV Sandhausen players
3. Liga players
Regionalliga players